Andrew Hutchins Mickle (October 25, 1805 – January 25, 1863) was the 67th Mayor of New York City from 1846 to 1847.

Biography
Mickle was born in New York City.  As a young man he married the daughter of George B. Miller, a tobacco dealer, afterwards working in his father-in-law's firm.

The George B. Miller & Co. tobacco business became famous as one of the first makers of the fine cut variety of chewing tobacco.  Mickle eventually inherited the business and renamed it A. H. Mickle & Sons.  He expanded the firm and its product line, and became wealthy as a result.

A Democrat affiliated with the Tammany Hall organization, in 1845 he won election as Mayor of New York City, taking advantage of a four-way race to win with a plurality.  After serving one two-year term Mickle declined to run for reelection and returned to his business interests.

Mickle died in Bayside, Queens on January 25, 1863.  He was buried at Green-Wood Cemetery in Brooklyn.

References

1805 births
1863 deaths
19th-century American politicians
19th-century American businesspeople
Burials at Green-Wood Cemetery
People from Manhattan
New York (state) Democrats
People from Bayside, Queens
Mayors of New York City
American tobacco industry executives